Dvorane is a village located in the Kruševac municipality in central Serbia. It is a part of the Rasina District. According to the 2002 census it had a population of 593.

People
Peter Novak (born Petar Stojadinovic, November 8, 1929 - November 24, 2004), prominent Serbian-American businessman and inventor.

Kruševac
Populated places in Rasina District